Kim Soo-nyung (born April 5, 1971 in Chungcheongbuk-do) is a former member of the South Korean Olympic archery team in 1988, 1992, and 2000.

She has earned a total of four gold medals at the Olympics, one for the individual event in 1988 and three for the team event in 1988, 1992 and 2000.  She won a further silver medal in 1992 and a bronze in 2000, both for the individual events. She retired after the 1992 Olympics to marry and raise two children, resuming her training in 1999, in the lead up to the 2000 Summer Olympics.

She competed at the 1990 Asian Games winning a gold medal in the team event and a bronze in the individual. She also won two consecutive individual and team world championships in 1989 and 1991.

In 2011, Kim was declared the Female Archer of the 20th Century by the International Archery Federation (FITA).

See also
Korean archery
Archery
List of South Korean archers

References

1971 births
Living people
South Korean female archers
Archers at the 1988 Summer Olympics
Archers at the 1992 Summer Olympics
Archers at the 2000 Summer Olympics
Olympic archers of South Korea
Olympic gold medalists for South Korea
Olympic silver medalists for South Korea
Olympic bronze medalists for South Korea
Olympic medalists in archery
Asian Games medalists in archery
Archers at the 1990 Asian Games
Medalists at the 2000 Summer Olympics
World Archery Championships medalists
Medalists at the 1992 Summer Olympics
Medalists at the 1988 Summer Olympics
Asian Games gold medalists for South Korea
Asian Games bronze medalists for South Korea
Medalists at the 1990 Asian Games
Sportspeople from North Chungcheong Province
20th-century South Korean women